iCOMP for Intel Comparative Microprocessor Performance was an index published by Intel used to measure the relative performance of its microprocessors.

There were three revisions of the iCOMP index. Version 1.0 (1992) was benchmarked against the 486SX 25, while version 2.0 (1996) was benchmarked against the Pentium 120. For Version 3.0 (1999) it was Pentium II at 350MHz.

See also
 PR rating

References

X86 architecture
Computer performance